Hanna Kolb (born 21 August 1991 in Stuttgart) is a German cross-country skier who has competed since 2007. She finished 25th in the individual sprint event at the 2010 Winter Olympics in Vancouver.

Kolb's best World Cup finish was 11th in a sprint event at Germany in 2009.

Cross-country skiing results
All results are sourced from the International Ski Federation (FIS).

Olympic Games

World Championships

World Cup
All results are sourced from the International Ski Federation (FIS).

Season standings

Team podiums
 2 podiums (2 )

References

External links

 
 
 
 

1991 births
Cross-country skiers at the 2010 Winter Olympics
Cross-country skiers at the 2014 Winter Olympics
Cross-country skiers at the 2018 Winter Olympics
German female cross-country skiers
Tour de Ski skiers
Living people
Olympic cross-country skiers of Germany
Sportspeople from Stuttgart
20th-century German women
21st-century German women